Reema Harrysingh-Carmona (born 22 November 1970) is a Trinidadian and Tobagonian economist who served as the First Lady of Trinidad and Tobago from 2013 until 2018. She is the wife of the fifth President of the Republic of Trinidad and Tobago, Anthony Carmona.

Early life
Reema Harrysingh Carmona was born in Hoboken, New Jersey. Her father, the late Cobee Harrysingh was a retired engineering contractor and her mother is Savitri Seeteram-Harrysingh. She is the daughter of Indo-Trinidadian parents, and attended St. Brigid's Girls' Roman Catholic and Iere High School, both in Siparia, Trinidad and Tobago. After graduating with nine 'O' Level passes from the Caribbean Examinations Council, she migrated to Canada where she attended Cairine Wilson High School, Ottawa.  She subsequently attended the University of Ottawa, from which she obtained a degree of Bachelor of Science in Economics. She and President Carmona have two children, Christian (b. 1999) and Anura (b. 2002). Her religious affiliation is Sanātanī Hinduism, although her husband President Anthony Carmona is a Roman Catholic Christian of Cocoa panyol descent.

Harrysingh-Carmona lived in the United States and Canada before relocating to Trinidad.

Career
After 11 years in Canada, Harrysingh-Carmona returned to Trinidad and Tobago, where she worked both at the Point Lisas Industrial Port Development Corporation (PLIPDECO) and the Small Business Development Corporation.

First Lady
Harrysingh-Carmona is the wife of Anthony Carmona, fifth president of The Republic of Trinidad and Tobago, in office from 2013 until 2018. They got married at the La Davina Pastora Catholic Church in south Trinidad in 1997. Her social work includes support for the Diabetes Association, Children Obesity prevention, and Autism Awareness among others.

References

1970 births
First Ladies of Trinidad and Tobago
Indian American
People from Hoboken, New Jersey
Trinidad and Tobago economists
Trinidad and Tobago people of Indian descent
Living people